The Men's ski slopestyle competition at the FIS Freestyle Ski and Snowboarding World Championships 2021 was held on 13 March. A qualification was held on 11 March 2021.

Qualification
The qualification was started on 11 March at 12:45. The six best skiers from each heat qualified for the final.

Heat 1

Heat 2

Final
The final was started on 13 March at 09:30.

References

Men's ski slopestyle